Charles Witherle Hooke (December 23, 1861 - May 17, 1929) was an American writer. His humorous stories were collected and published. At least one of his writings was adapted into a film. He used the pseudonym Howard Fielding.

He was born in Castine, Maine.

He graduated from Harvard University with a degree in literature.

Writings
Automatic Bridget, and other humorous stories
A New York Alderman: Experience of a City Father in 1898
The mind cure, and other humorous sketches Manhattan Therapeutic Co. New York c1888
Col. Evans from Kentucky, and other humorous sketches Manhattan Therapeutic Co. New York 1889
The Victim of His Clothes co-written with Frederick Russell Burton, J. S. Ogilvie New York 1890
Straight Crooks: A Detective Story (1927)

Filmography
The Inspirations of Harry Larrabbee (1917) based on his story written as Howard Fielding
Mentioned in Confidence (1917), based on his story written as Howard Fielding

References

19th-century American writers
20th-century American writers
Harvard University alumni
People from Castine, Maine
1861 births
1929 deaths